"Take Control" is a 2006 song by Amerie.

Take Control or Taking Control may also refer to:
 Take Control (horse), a racehorse born in 2007 and deceased in 2013
 Take Control, a series of electronic books by Tidbits
 "Take Control", the slogan for the Vote Leave campaign during the 2016 United Kingdom European Union membership referendum

Music

Albums
 Take Control (Slaves album), 2016
 Take Control, a 2006 album by State of Mind

Songs
 "Take Control", a song by Old Gods of Asgard (Poets of the Fall), written for Control (video game)
 "Take Control" (DJ BoBo song), 1993
 "Take Control" (Roll Deep song), 2010
 "Taking Control", a song by Aphex Twin from his 2001 album Drukqs
 "Take Control", a song by BKS
 "Take Control", a song by Culture Club from their 1982 album Kissing to Be Clever
 "Take Control", a song by Jaimeson
 "Take Control", a song by Lords of Acid from their 1991 album Lust
 "Take Control", a song by Raven from their 1983 album All for One
 "Take Control", a song by Sick of It All from their 2003 album Life on the Ropes
 "Take Control", a song by Weezer from their 2000 album Maladroit
 "Take Control", a B-side to Will Young's 2004 single "Your Game"
 "Take Control", a song by Killswitch Engage from the album Atonement, 2019

See also
 Take Care & Control, a 1998 album by Death in June